Rhythm of Black Lines was a rock group from Austin, Texas founded in 1998 by Clint Newsom, Kiki Solis, Tim O'Neil, Omar Chavez, and Paul Newman. The band's first two albums were issued on the Sixgunlover imprint. The group released their last record on Gold Standard Laboratories label, run by Sonny Kay and Omar Rodríguez-López.

Discography
Rhythm of Black Lines (1999) Sixgunlover Records
Set a Summary Table (2000) Sixgunlover Records
HOME Vol. 3 - Split With Pavo (2001) Post-Parlo Records
Split With Pele (2002) Sixgunlover Records
Human Hand, Animal Band (2004) Gold Standard Laboratories

References

Rock music groups from Texas
Musical groups from Austin, Texas
Musical groups established in 1998
1998 establishments in Texas